Pseudonocardia alni is a bacterium from the genus of Pseudonocardia which has been isolated from the roots of the tree Alnus incana.

References

Pseudonocardia
Bacteria described in 1989